Daanosaurus (meaning "Da'an lizard" after Da'an district in Zigong, Sichuan) was a genus of dinosaur. It was a sauropod which lived during the Late Jurassic (Oxfordian - Tithonian stage, about 163 - 145 mya). It lived in what is now China (Sichuan Province), and was similar to Bellusaurus. When it was described, Daanosaurus was placed in the Bellusaurinae, a sub-family of Brachiosauridae that Dong Zhiming had raised in 1990 to house Bellusaurus, or the Klamelisauridae (also now merged with Brachiosauridae), used to house Klamelisaurus and possibly also Daanosaurus and Abrosaurus. More recently, other authors have placed Daanosaurus in the Eusauropoda, potentially the Macronaria, but one hypothesis is that it is a mamenchisaurid.

The type species from the Shaximiao Formation was described in 2005 as Daanosaurus zhangi. Adult size is unknown due to a lack of fossil remains. The holotype (ZDM 0193), which is the only known specimen, was a juvenile.

References 

Brachiosaurs
Kimmeridgian life
Late Jurassic dinosaurs of Asia
Jurassic China
Fossils of China
Fossil taxa described in 2005
Paleontology in Sichuan